Franklin Freeman Randall, known by his stage name Fly Young Red is an American rapper who gained notoriety due to his controversial song "Throw That Boy Pussy".

Career

Red was born in New Orleans, Louisiana, and raised in Southern California to a religious baptist family where he was an active Christian at that time. In his early teenage years, was a member of a short lived male hip hop/R&B group. When he was fourteen years old, due to events of Hurricane Katrina, he moved to Houston, Texas where he currently resides.

Red negotiated a deal with Las Vegas based music video production team Level Eight Studios to produce a music video for the song "Throw That Boy Pussy". The video, which was shot in the summer of 2013, and later released in the Spring of 2014 became popular. In an April 2014 interview with BET, Red stated that he "wasn't ready for a record deal", and that he wasn't contracted by a music label.

Personal life
Red identifies as gay. He decided to be open about his sexuality due to the lack of hip-hop songs played in gay clubs.

See also
LGBT hip hop

References

1991 births
African-American rappers
Cash Money Records artists
American gay musicians
Living people
LGBT African Americans
LGBT people from Louisiana
LGBT rappers
Rappers from New Orleans
21st-century American rappers
20th-century LGBT people
21st-century LGBT people
21st-century African-American musicians